Edward Samuel Smith (March 27, 1919 – March 22, 2001) was a United States circuit judge of the United States Court of Appeals for the Federal Circuit and previously a United States Judge of the United States Court of Claims.

Education and career

Born in Birmingham, Alabama, Smith received a Bachelor of Arts degree from the University of Virginia in 1941 and served as a lieutenant in the United States Naval Reserve during World War II, from 1941 to 1946. He received a Juris Doctor from the University of Virginia School of Law in 1947 and entered private practice in Washington, D.C. from 1947 to 1961. He joined the Tax Division of the United States Department of Justice, first as chief of the trial section in 1961, and then as a deputy assistant attorney general for civil trials from 1962 to 1963. He returned to private practice in Baltimore, Maryland from 1963 to 1978.

Federal judicial service

Smith was nominated by President Jimmy Carter on June 30, 1978, to a seat on the United States Court of Claims vacated by Judge Byron George Skelton. He was confirmed by the United States Senate on July 26, 1978, and received commission on July 28, 1978. His service was terminated on October 1, 1982, due to reassignment to the Federal Circuit.

Smith was reassigned by operation of law on October 1, 1982, to the United States Court of Appeals for the Federal Circuit, to a new seat authorized by 96 Stat. 25. He assumed senior status on June 1, 1989. His service terminated on March 22, 2001, due to his death in Birmingham.

References

Sources
 

1919 births
2001 deaths
Judges of the United States Court of Claims
Judges of the United States Court of Appeals for the Federal Circuit
United States Article I federal judges appointed by Jimmy Carter
20th-century American judges
United States Navy reservists
United States Navy personnel of World War II